Walls is the second studio album by the Australian indie rock duo An Horse. It was recorded in Vancouver, British Columbia, Canada in Summer 2010 at The Armoury and released on 26 April 2011 on Mom + Pop Music. It features Kate Cooper on guitar and vocals, Damon Cox on drums, backing vocals and keys and was produced and mixed by Howard Redekopp.

Track listing

Production
 Howard Redekopp - Producer, Engineer, Mixer
 Jarett Holmes - Assistant Engineer

Additional Personnel 
 Sara Quin - Backing Vocals on "Swallow the Sea"

In popular culture
"Trains and Tracks" was featured in the 2017 British comedy-drama film Happy Birthday, Toby Simpson.

References

External links 
 Official website
 Mom + Pop Music

2011 albums
An Horse albums
Mom + Pop Music albums